Yiannis Zisimides (Greek: Γιάννης Ζησιμίδης; born 17 August 1967) is a retired Cypriot athlete who competed in the sprinting events. He represented his country at three Summer Olympics, in 1992, 1996 and 2000.

He is the current national record holder in the 100 metres and indoor 60 metres.

Competition record

Personal bests
Outdoor
100 metres – 10.11 (+1.5 m/s) (Rethymno 1996) 
200 metres – 20.82 (+1.0 m/s) (Rethymno 1996)

Indoor
60 metres – 6.58 (Piraeus 1996)

References

1967 births
Living people
Cypriot male sprinters
Athletes (track and field) at the 1990 Commonwealth Games
Athletes (track and field) at the 1992 Summer Olympics
Athletes (track and field) at the 1996 Summer Olympics
Athletes (track and field) at the 2000 Summer Olympics
Olympic athletes of Cyprus
Commonwealth Games competitors for Cyprus
World Athletics Championships athletes for Cyprus
Athletes (track and field) at the 1987 Mediterranean Games
Athletes (track and field) at the 1991 Mediterranean Games
Athletes (track and field) at the 1993 Mediterranean Games
Athletes (track and field) at the 1997 Mediterranean Games
Mediterranean Games silver medalists for Cyprus
Mediterranean Games bronze medalists for Cyprus
Mediterranean Games medalists in athletics